The 1899 Ireland rugby union tour of Canada occurred in October 1899, twenty four years after Ireland's first international. It was Ireland's first ever international tour. It was also the first overseas tour undertaken by any of the home countries as a single entity. Seventeen players were selected to make the journey to Canada but no caps were awarded. Three clubs – Dublin University, Lansdowne and North of Ireland FC – provided fifteen of these players. Many of those who went on the tour had not played, nor did they subsequently play, for Ireland. Many of those who were part of the 1899 Triple Crown side were not able to afford the time or cost of the trip. Ireland often had to field just fourteen players due to injuries. Among those to be injured was James Myles who broke his leg. Myles, who was later elected as an independent TD of East Donegal, had to remain in Canada until December. The rest of the touring party had returned home in November. Ireland won 10 of the 11 matches they played. Their only defeat came against a Halifax XV in the third game of the tour. They scored 150 points and conceded 51. The trip was financed by Duke Collins, an Irish Canadian who originally came from County Dublin but had settled in Toronto.

Matches
Scores and results list Ireland's points tally first.

Touring party

Manager:
Secretary:
Referee:
Captain: James G. Franks

Squad

See also
Ireland national rugby union team tours

References

Ireland national rugby union team tours
Rugby union tours of Canada
Ireland tour
Ireland Rugby Union Tour of Canada, 1899
Canada–Ireland relations
Rugby Union Tour